The Algerian Championnat National 2 season 2000-01.

League table

Central West

Central East

References

Algerian Ligue 2 seasons
2000–01 in Algerian football
Algeria